Wallace Leslie Lawler (15 March 191228 September 1972) was a British Liberal politician. He was elected a Member of Parliament (MP) by gaining Birmingham, Ladywood from Labour at a by-election on 26 June 1969. However, Lawler only served for one year, as Labour's Doris Fisher regained the seat from him at the 1970 general election. He was the last Liberal to serve as a Member of Parliament in Birmingham, until John Hemming of the successor Liberal Democrats gained Birmingham, Yardley in 2005.

Early life and career
Wallace Lawler was born in Worcester, the son of Stephen and Elizabeth Lawler (née Taylor). He was educated at St Paul's School, Worcester and privately at Malvern, Worcestershire. In 1943 he married Catherine Letitia Durcan. They had two sons and two daughters.

Lawler had an early interest in community projects and youth work in particular. In 1928 he founded the Worcester Boys’ Club for teenagers and was involved in youth work until he went to Birmingham in 1938 to work as an aircraft engineer. During the Second World War, Lawler served in the 8th Battalion, the Worcestershire Regiment. In 1964 he founded his own plastics business and later took over another established firm called ABCD Plastics, of which he became chairman.

Following up his interest in youth work, Lawler was associated with a wide range of community organisations. In 1943, he founded the Public Opinion Action Association. In 1956, he became Secretary and later Chairman of an emergency accommodation bureau to find homes for homeless people in Birmingham set up after a conference of religious, civic, political and business people presided over by the Bishop of Birmingham, Dr J L Wilson. He also worked for the community through the Wallace Lawler Friendship Trust (1969) and Citizens’ Service Ltd (1970)

Local politics

At the time of the 1945 general election, Lawler was said to be a man opposed to all political parties, but during the 1950s he became active in the Liberal Party, even though its electoral record in the West Midlands was dismal.

In 1962, Lawler became the first Liberal to be elected to Birmingham City Council for nearly 30 years when he won the Newtown Ward. He was re-elected in 1965, not only holding his seat but increasing his majority fourfold. This was despite the fact that Labour worked hard to unseat him and had assigned one of the party's most experienced agents to work to secure his defeat. He retained his Newtown seat again in 1968, and between 1968–1972 he led the Liberal Party's small group on the Council. In 1971, he was created an Alderman, a position he held until he died the following year.

Lawler held a number of important Liberal posts in the Birmingham area, including Chairman of Birmingham Liberal Organisation, and became the first chairman of the Birmingham Liberal Federation when it was founded in 1965. The new Federation was established to end dissension between Birmingham Liberal Organisation and the West Midlands Liberal Federation and the ambitious plan was to make Birmingham the spearhead of a campaign to win industrial seats for the Liberal Party.

Lawler first stood for Parliament as Liberal candidate in Dudley in the Black Country at the 1955 general election coming third with under 10% share of the vote and losing his deposit. He fought Birmingham, Perry Barr at the 1959 general election, again coming third, but this time gaining 14% of the poll and avoided losing his deposit. In 1964, he was the candidate in Birmingham, Handsworth. Again he came third, but achieved 17.6% of the poll.

Ladywood

At the 1966 general election, he switched to Birmingham, Ladywood. In what was by that time one of the smallest constituencies in the country, with an electorate of only just over 25,000 (to be compared with electorates of around double that in the rest of the city) Lawler found he was able to make a greater impact at Parliamentary level, campaigning directly with the people who lived in the area. He managed to come second to Labour in 1966, beating the Conservatives into third place. He gained nearly 24% of the vote to Labour's 58%. This result, plus the work in the constituency that Lawler did in the next three years, laid the foundation for his attempt on the seat at the Ladywood by-election in 1969.

Ladywood by-election, 1969

Against the backdrop of massive redevelopment in Birmingham city centre, the electorate of Ladywood had shrunk, the constituency suffered from significant deprivation and its population would today be classified as socially excluded. Given his own background of community work and his experience as a city councillor, Lawler involved himself heavily in the problems of the community, championing the underprivileged and their concerns over housing, homelessness and social upheaval. In 1967, in the controversy which followed the first screening of the Television drama Cathy Come Home the previous December, he was reported as saying that he dealt with a "Cathy family" every day in his political work in Birmingham. Later in 1967, he organised a mass petition with more than 80,000 signatures to the prime minister to protest against increases in electricity prices, and that October he arranged a protest demonstration of mainly Birmingham pensioners to travel to London to hand in letters and petitions at 10 Downing Street.

After the sitting Labour MP for Ladywood, Victor Yates, died in January 1969, a by-election was caused. The election writ was not moved for months, giving Lawler time to consolidate his position. When the election was held on 26 June, he won the seat with a majority of 2,713 votes over his Labour rival Doris Fisher, with the Conservative, Dr Louis Glass, in third place. All three candidates were members of Birmingham City Council. Ladywood was the first Liberal parliamentary success in Birmingham for 80 years.

1970 General Election

Patrick Brogan in The Times reported during the 1970 general election campaign that "Wallace Lawler is living proof that personality matters in politics. He is Liberal MP for Birmingham Ladywood. Single-handed, he has revived Liberalism in a city which had long forgotten there was such a thing.....He knows everybody and all their problems and everybody knows him".

Lawler did not hold the seat he had gained at the by-election the year before as the seat was regained for Labour, with a majority of 980 votes, by Doris Fisher.

National Liberal politics

Lawler was active for the Liberal party at national level. He was Vice-Chairman of the Liberal Party Council (1967) and Vice-President of the Liberal Party Executive in 1968. While he was in Parliament, he was Liberal Party spokesman on housing and pensions and he served as a Member of the Select committee on Race Relations and used this platform to warn Enoch Powell he would not be able to make immigration an election issue, saying the electorate had more immediate and pressing issues to worry them such as the cost of living. Despite this stance, Lawler's reputation inside the Liberal Party locally and nationally was somewhat tarnished by his views on Commonwealth immigration. He advocated a policy of dispersal of immigrants and suggested that most categories of immigrants should be prevented from settling in Birmingham. Councillor Paul Tilsley was one leading Liberal in Birmingham to express doubts about the choice of Lawler for the Ladywood by-election, given his controversial remarks about immigration in 1968.

Community politics

Political commentators and historians of the Liberal Party usually agree that the development of community politics proved a major stimulus in reviving the political and electoral fortunes of the Liberal Party after 1970 and that the techniques of community politics were used to good electoral effects across Britain but especially in the city of Liverpool and other urban centres. The Liberal Party Assembly at Eastbourne in 1970 adopted community politics as an electoral and philosophical approach, declaring that ‘Our role as political activists is to help and organise people in communities to take and use power, to use our political skills to redress grievances; and to represent people at all levels of the political structure." Stuart Mole commented that "The techniques of community politics had first been fashioned in the Newtown area of Birmingham by Wallace Lawler". This was appropriate according to one historian of the Liberal Party because of community politics’ curious echoes of tactics used by Joseph Chamberlain and Francis Schnadhorst to build up Liberal support in Birmingham almost a century earlier.

As one political scientist has commented, "In fact community organisation in Britain was not pioneered by new social movements but by the Liberal Party in Birmingham. Its leader in the 1960s, Wallace Lawler, placed a high priority on organisation in the localities."

Publications
 Pensions For All, 1958
 The Truth About Cathy, 1968

See also
 List of United Kingdom MPs with the shortest service

References

External links
 

1912 births
1972 deaths
Liberal Party (UK) MPs for English constituencies
UK MPs 1966–1970
History of Birmingham, West Midlands
Politicians from Worcester, England